The 1953 Detroit Titans football team represented the University of Detroit in the Missouri Valley Conference (MVC) during the 1953 college football season. In its third year under head coach Dutch Clark, Detroit compiled a 6–4 record (3–1 against conference opponents), tied for the MVC championship, and outscored all opponents by a combined total of 231 to 124.

The team's assistant coaches were Wally Fromhart (backfield coach, third year), Kenneth L. Stilley (line coach, first year), Edmund J. Barbour (freshman coach since 1931), and Dr. Raymond D. Forsyth (team physician). The team co-captains were guard Denny McCotter and tackle Dick Martwick.

Schedule

References

External links
 1953 University of Detroit football programs

Detroit
Detroit Titans football seasons
Missouri Valley Conference football champion seasons
Detroit Titans football
Detroit Titans football